Deep Puddle Dynamics was a collaborative group featuring underground hip hop artists Sole, Doseone, Alias and Slug.

History
Deep Puddle Dynamics released the album The Taste of Rain... Why Kneel? on Anticon in 1999.

Discography

Albums
 The Taste of Rain... Why Kneel? (1999)

EPs
 We Ain't Fessin' (Double Quotes) (2002)

Singles
 "Rainmen" (1999)

Compilation appearances
 "Rainmen" on Music for the Advancement of Hip Hop (1999)
 "Mothers of Invention" on Anticon Label Sampler: 1999-2004 (2004)

References

External links

American hip hop groups
Anticon